Boyn Hill is a suburb of Maidenhead in the English county of Berkshire.

It is located west of the town centre, between the A4 and the railway.

References

Maidenhead